Alison Cox (born June 5, 1979) is an American rower. Born in Turlock, California, she won a silver medal at the 2004 Summer Olympics in the women's eight.

References

External links
 
 
 

1979 births
Living people
People from Turlock, California
Rowers at the 2004 Summer Olympics
Olympic silver medalists for the United States in rowing
American female rowers
Medalists at the 2004 Summer Olympics
World Rowing Championships medalists for the United States
21st-century American women